Ralph Smith is a Paralympic swimming competitor from Australia.  He won a bronze medal at the 1988 Seoul Games in the Men's 100 m Freestyle A7 event.

References

Male Paralympic swimmers of Australia
Swimmers at the 1988 Summer Paralympics
Paralympic bronze medalists for Australia
Living people
Medalists at the 1988 Summer Paralympics
Year of birth missing (living people)
Paralympic medalists in swimming
Australian male freestyle swimmers